Genetic World is the debut studio album by the French electronic music trio Télépopmusik, released in 2001. The album was re-released in 2002 as per request of the producer Heisenberg. Angela McCluskey appeared as a special guest vocalist and co-writer of many of the album's tracks. She performed on "Love Can Damage Your Health", “Smile", "Breathe", and "Yesterday Was a Lie", the first three of which were also singles.

One of the singles, "Breathe", was a commercial success, charting in both the US and the UK.

McCluskey and the members of Télépopmusik first met when they opened for the band The Wild Colonials (of which she is a member) in New York and struck a friendship.

Critical reception 
The album was met with praise from music critics upon its release. On review aggregate website Metacritic, the album holds a score of 70/100, indicating "generally favorable reviews." Tom Semioli, writing for AllMusic, awarded the album 3 out of 5 stars and felt that, while the album was eclectic, it was still good. He singled out "Dance Me," "Da Hoola," and "Let's Go Again" as choice cuts, and concluded that the album "contains a little something for every music fan."

Accolades 
"Breathe" was nominated for a Grammy Award in the category Best Dance Recording at the ceremony held in February 2004. It lost, however, to "Come into My World" by Kylie Minogue.

Track listing 
 "Breathe" (featuring Angela McCluskey) – 4:39
 "Genetic World" (featuring Soda-Pop) – 3:59
 "Love Can Damage Your Health" (featuring Angela McCluskey) – 5:32 *
 "Smile" (featuring Angela McCluskey) – 3:58
 "Dance Me" – 3:33
 "Da Hoola" (Soda-Pop mix) – 4:12 *
 "Let's Go Again" – 3:01 * 
 "Trishika" (featuring Soda-Pop) – 5:56 *
 "Yesterday Was a Lie" – 4:59 *
 "L'Incertitude D'Heisenberg" – 5:50 * 
 "Breathe" (New extended mix) (featuring Angela McCluskey) (Bonus track) – 5:55

International version
 "Breathe" (featuring Angela McCluskey) – 4:39
 "Genetic World" (featuring Soda-Pop) – 3:59
 "Love Can Damage your Health" (featuring Angela McCluskey) – 5:32 *
 "Animal Man" (featuring Juice Aleem) – 4:27 *
 "Free" (featuring Juice Aleem) – 3:52
 "Let's Go Again" (featuring Gonzales and Peaches) – 3:01 *
 "Dance Me" – 3:33
 "Da Hoola" (Soda-Pop mix) – 4:12 *
 "Smile" (featuring Angela McCluskey) – 3:58
 "Trishika" (featuring Soda-Pop) – 5:56 *
 "Yesterday Was a Lie" – 4:59 *
 "δp.δq≥" – 5:50 * 

Note
tracks Noted * feature short, numbered (1–7) interludes entitled "Labs" at the end.

Charts 
Aided by the success of "Breathe", the album charted in the UK, where it reached number 88. Genetic World was also somewhat successful in the United States, where it reached number 5 on the Dance/Electronic Albums chart, spending more than 20 weeks total on the chart.

It has sold over 350,000 copies worldwide.

References

External links 
 

2001 albums
Capitol Records albums
Télépopmusik albums
Deep house albums
Electropop albums